Miguel Ángel Osorio Chong (5 August 1964) is a Mexican politician who served as the Secretary of the Interior in the cabinet of Enrique Peña Nieto. He was Governor of Hidalgo until April 2011.

Early life
Born in Pachuca, Hidalgo, he is a graduate of the Autonomous University of Hidalgo State Law School. He is of Chinese descent through his mother's family.

Political career
In 2003, Osorio was elected to serve as a Representative in the Chamber of Deputies of Mexico, hence he served during the LIX Legislature. He left his seat in order to become the Institutional Revolutionary Party's candidate for Governor of the State of Hidalgo, which he won by a wide margin of votes, defeating José Guadarrama Márquez, candidate of the Party of the Democratic Revolution, Antonio Haghenbeck Cámara, of the National Action Party and Arturo Aparicio Ramos, of the Labor Party.

Before being elected Governor he held several public positions in the administration of the state of Hidalgo, mainly performing in the portfolios of Government and Social Development. He was elected Governor of the state of Hidalgo in 2005 for the period 1 April 2005, through to 31 March 2011.

He was appointed Secretary of the Interior by President Enrique Peña Nieto. After assuming office, the Ministry absorbed the functions of two former ministries, that of Government and the one which was in charge of Homeland Security. Besides, he assumed the responsibility of being the coordinator of the whole cabinet.
His wife, Laura Vargas, is national Director of DIF, the National System for Integral Family Development. In July 2015, while on a state visit to France with President Nieto, notorious drug kingpin Joaquin Guzman Loera escaped from a federal prison; he was dispatched back to Mexico to lead the effort at recapture which he was involved with El Chapo for a long time.

In response to questions about inconsistencies in his declaration of weath, Senator Osorio presented four boxes of documents to the Secretariat of the Civil Service (SFP) in August 2020. The newspaper Reforma had published an article in July questioning his supposed home ownership in Mexico City.

References

External links
 Biography by CIDOB

1964 births
Living people
Politicians from Pachuca, Hidalgo
Institutional Revolutionary Party politicians
Members of the Chamber of Deputies (Mexico)
Mexican people of Chinese descent
Mexican politicians of Chinese descent
Governors of Hidalgo (state)
Mexican Secretaries of the Interior
21st-century Mexican politicians
Universidad Autónoma del Estado de Hidalgo alumni
Deputies of the LIX Legislature of Mexico
Members of the Senate of the Republic (Mexico)